Bob Pinodo  also known as the Show Master of Africa is a Ghanaian highlife musician, songwriter, producer, and composer.

Career 
His album Show Master of Africa had air play on BBC winning him awards in various categories like best album, best composition, best production, best recording and album of the millennium by Entertainment Critics and Reviewers Association of Ghana (ECRAG) and the Ghana Broadcasting Corporation (GBC) respectively. He also taught at the University of Education for over ten years.

Discography

Album 
Show Master of Africa

 Disco Dance”
 Yesu Ne M’agyenkwa
 Love is Love
 Girl with the Guitar Shape
 Come Back Love
 Africa
 Darling
 Peep

Awards 

 He was honoured with the lifetime achievement awards at the 2021 Vodafone Ghana Music Awards.
 He received an award for the most talented musician by the art council in 1969.
The Album Show Master of Africa was adjudged album of the Millennium by the Entertainment Critics and Reviewers Association of Ghana (ECRAG)

References 

Living people
Ghanaian highlife musicians
21st-century Ghanaian male singers
Year of birth missing (living people)